Labeo rajasthanicus is a species of fish in the genus Labeo.

It is known only from Lake Jasiamand in Rajasthan, India.

References

Labeo
Fish described in 1970